King Mosque may refer to:

King Mosque, Berat, in Berat, Albania
King Mosque, Elbasan, in Elbasan, Albania